"Stop Draggin' My Heart Around" is a song recorded by Stevie Nicks and Tom Petty and the Heartbreakers and released as the first single from Nicks' debut solo album Bella Donna (1981). The track is the album's only song that was neither written nor co-written by Nicks. Written by Tom Petty and Mike Campbell as a Tom Petty and the Heartbreakers song, Jimmy Iovine, who was also working for Stevie Nicks at the time, arranged for her to sing on it. Petty sang with Nicks in the chorus and bridge, while his entire band (save Ron Blair, whose bass track was played by Donald "Duck" Dunn instead) played on the song.

A performance of the song in the studio was used as the promotional video. The video was the 25th video to be played on MTV's launch date on August 1, 1981. Petty and Nicks also sang together on the songs "Insider" (from Petty's album Hard Promises (1981)) and "I Will Run to You" (from Nicks's album The Wild Heart (1983)), and frequently performed impromptu live versions of these and 1960s classic "Needles and Pins" in many shows through the 1980s.

As of 2017, "Stop Draggin' My Heart Around" remains a mainstay of Stevie Nicks's solo performances, and on July 9, 2017, Nicks performed the song together with Petty and the Heartbreakers at the British Summer Time festival at Hyde Park in London, in what turned out to be their final performance of the song together before Petty's death in October 2017.

The song peaked at No. 3 on the American Billboard Hot 100 for six consecutive weeks, (Nicks's biggest solo hit and the Heartbreakers' biggest hit as well). However, in the United Kingdom, the song only managed to peak at No. 50.

Content
In a November 2003 interview with Songfacts, Tom Petty and the Heartbreakers guitarist and primary songwriter Mike Campbell explained the song's origins:

The lyrics are about a woman who feels weighed down by relationships and wants to part despite a strong sentimental attachment to her lover. The melody is described by All Music as "dark and sinister". Apart from the intro before the first verse and a solo following the second verse (where there is some fairly heavy riffing), however, the guitar sound is laid-back in typical Heartbreakers style. The song was originally recorded for Petty's album Hard Promises, but the producers felt the song came from a female point of view and it was left unreleased until it was agreed to be put on the Bella Donna album instead. A demo version of the song, recorded without Nicks, was eventually released on Petty's boxed set Playback (1995).

Billboard called it a "punchy uptempo piece of rock."  Record World said that "Nicks' uncompromising vocal pairs perfectly with Petty."

Personnel
Band
 Stevie Nicks – lead vocals
 Lori Perry – backing vocals
 Sharon Celani – backing vocals
 Tom Petty – co-lead vocals, guitar
 Michael Campbell – lead guitar
 Benmont Tench – organ
 Stan Lynch – drums

Additional musicians 
 Donald "Duck" Dunn – bass guitar
 Phil Jones – percussion

Charts

Weekly charts

Year-end charts

Cover versions
The song was parodied by "Weird Al" Yankovic as "Stop Draggin' My Car Around" on his debut album "Weird Al" Yankovic (1983).

Jimmy Fallon and Stevie Nicks performed the song in a humorous recreation of the 1981 music video on The Tonight Show on April 9, 2014.

References

1981 debut singles
1981 singles
Song recordings produced by Jimmy Iovine
Songs written by Mike Campbell (musician)
Songs written by Tom Petty
Stevie Nicks songs
Tom Petty songs
Male–female vocal duets
Modern Records (1980) singles